Officially the Center for the Advancement of Natural Discoveries using Light Emission, more commonly CANDLE Synchrotron Research Institute, is a project and a research  center-institute in Yerevan, Armenia. CANDLE is a project of 3 gigaelectronvolts energy, third generation synchrotron light source for fundamental, industrial and applied research in biology, physics, chemistry, medicine, material and environmental sciences.

Overall the facility is expected to serve more than 40 research groups simultaneously supporting the spectroscopy, scattering, imaging and time resolved experiments.

The project is claimed to be demanded by international scientific community and is expected to have a vast impact on development of science in Armenia.

The government of Armenia allocated an area of 20 ha near the town of Abovyan for the upcoming projects of the center.

References

External links
 Official website
 CANDLE Project Overview, V.Tsakanov, Proc. PAC'2005, Knoxville, Tennessee.
 
 

Educational institutions established in 2010
Education in Yerevan
Synchrotron radiation facilities
2010 establishments in Armenia